The 2013 BWF World Junior Championships were held in Bangkok, Thailand from October 23 to November 3, 2013.

Medalists

Medal table

External links
World Juniors Team Championships 2013 at Tournamentsoftware.com
World Junior Championships 2013 at Tournamentsoftware.com

 
World Championships, Junior
 in youth sport
Badminton, World Championships, Junior
Badminton, World Championships, Junior
World Championships, Junior
World Championships, Junior
BWF World Junior Championships
Badminton, World Championships, Junior
Badminton, World Championships, Junior